Stone Age is a compilation by The Rolling Stones released on the Decca label in 1971. It reached number four on the UK charts.

The Stones were strongly against this release. In full-page ads in Record Mirror and NME on 20 March 1971, they stated, "We didn't know this record was going to be released. It is, in our opinion, below the standard we try to keep up, both in choice of content and cover design." The 12 songs, dating from the mid-1960s, were chosen because they had never appeared on a UK studio album, some having been originally released only on singles and some having only been released on US studio albums to that point.

Background
This is the first compilation album released by Decca after The Rolling Stones left the label.
Decca continued to release Gimme Shelter (1971), Milestones (1972), Rock 'n' Rolling Stones (1972), No Stone Unturned (1973), Rolled Gold (1975), Solid Rock (1980) and Slow Rollers (1981)
None of these albums are released on CD, except a special version of Rolled Gold in 2007.

Track listing
All tracks composed by Mick Jagger and Keith Richards, except where noted.

Side one
"Look What You've Done" (McKinley Morganfield)
"It's All Over Now" (Bobby Womack, Shirley Womack)
"Confessin' the Blues" (Walter Brown, Jay McShann)
"One More Try"
"As Tears Go By" (Jagger, Richards, Andrew Loog Oldham)
"The Spider and the Fly" (Nanker Phelge)

Side two
"My Girl" (Smokey Robinson, Ronald White)
"Paint It Black"
"If You Need Me" (Wilson Pickett, Robert Bateman, Sonny Sanders)
"The Last Time"
"Blue Turns to Grey"
"Around and Around" (Chuck Berry)

Charts

References 

Albums produced by Andrew Loog Oldham
The Rolling Stones compilation albums
1971 compilation albums
Decca Records compilation albums